The Broadford Beds Formation is a Sinemurian geologic formation in western Scotland. An indeterminate partial tibia of a theropod dinosaur are among the fossils that have been recovered from the formation

See also 
 List of dinosaur-bearing rock formations
 List of stratigraphic units with indeterminate dinosaur fossils

References

Bibliography 
 Weishampel, David B.; Dodson, Peter; and Osmólska, Halszka (eds.): The Dinosauria, 2nd, Berkeley: University of California Press. 861 pp. .

Geologic formations of Scotland
Jurassic System of Europe
Jurassic United Kingdom
Sinemurian Stage
Limestone formations
Mudstone formations
Sandstone formations
Siltstone formations
Paleontology in Scotland